This is a list of defunct airlines of China.

Defunct airlines

See also
 List of airlines of China
 List of airports in China
 List of defunct airlines of Asia

References

China
Airlines, Defunct
Defunct